Epeuproctis is a monotypic moth genus in the family Erebidae. Its only species, Epeuproctis tamahonis, is found in Taiwan. Both the genus and species were first described by Shōnen Matsumura, the genus in 1933 and the species in 1927.

The Global Lepidoptera Names Index gives this name as a synonym of Euproctis Hübner, [1819].

References

Lymantriinae
Noctuoidea genera
Monotypic moth genera
Taxa named by Shōnen Matsumura